Noeledius is a genus of mites in the Phytoseiidae family.

Species
 Noeledius iphiformis (Muma, 1962)

References

Phytoseiidae